In digital communications, differential coding is a technique used to provide unambiguous signal reception when using some types of modulation. It makes data to be transmitted to depend not only on the current signal state (or symbol), but also on the previous one.

The common types of modulation that require differential coding include phase-shift keying and quadrature amplitude modulation.

Purposes of differential coding
When data is transmitted over twisted-pair wires, it is easy to accidentally insert an extra half-twist in the cable between the transmitter and the receiver. When this happens, the received signal is inverted.

Similarly for BPSK. To demodulate BPSK, one needs to make a local oscillator synchronous with the remote one. This is accomplished by a carrier recovery circuit. However, the integer part of the recovered carrier is ambiguous. There are n valid but not equivalent phase shifts between the two oscillators. For BPSK, n = 2; the symbols appear inverted or not.

Differential encoding prevents inversion of the signal and symbols, respectively, from affecting the data.

where  indicates binary or modulo-2 addition. On the decoding side,  is recovered as

There are several different line codes designed to be polarity insensitive -- whether the data stream is inverted or not, the decoded data will always be correct.
The line codes with this property include differential Manchester encoding, bipolar encoding, NRZI, biphase mark code, coded mark inversion, and MLT-3 encoding. coding Conventional differential coding

A method illustrated above can deal with a data stream inversion (it is called 180° ambiguity). Sometimes it is enough (e.g. if BPSK is used or if other ambiguities are detected by other circuits, such as a Viterbi decoder or a frame synchronizer) and sometimes it isn't.

Generally speaking, a differential coding applies to symbols (these are not necessary the same symbols as used in the modulator). To resolve 180° ambiguity only, bits are used as these symbols. When dealing with 90° ambiguity, pairs of bits are used, and triplets of bits are used to resolve 45° ambiguity (e.g. in 8PSK).

A differential encoder provides the  operation, a differential decoder - the  operation.

Both differential encoder and differential decoder are discrete linear time-invariant systems. The former is recursive and IIR, the latter is non-recursive and thus FIR. They can be analyzed as digital filters.

A differential encoder is similar to an analog integrator. It has an impulse response

and a transfer function

A differential decoder is thus similar to an analog differentiator, its impulse response being

and its transfer function

Note that in binary (modulo-2) arithmetic, addition and subtraction (and positive and negative numbers) are equivalent.

Generalized differential coding
Using the relation  is not the only way of carrying out differential encoding.

Applications
Differential coding is widely used in satellite and radio relay communications together with PSK and QAM modulations.

Drawbacks
Differential coding has one significant drawback: it leads to error multiplication.
This approximately doubles the BER at signal-to-noise ratios for which errors rarely occur in consecutive symbols.

Other techniques to resolve a phase ambiguity
Differential coding is not the only way to deal with a phase ambiguity. The other popular technique is to use syncwords for this purpose. That is, if a frame synchronizer'' detects repeated inverted sync-words, it inverts the whole stream. This method is used in DVB-S.

See also
 Phase-shift keying
 Satellite modem

External links and references

 INTELSAT Earth Station Standard IESS-308
 DVB framing structure, channel coding and modulation for 11/12 GHz satellite services (EN 300 421)

Data transmission